John Curtis Wood (born January 20, 1951) is a former professional American football player. He played defensive tackle in the National Football League (NFL) for the New Orleans Saints for one season, in 1973. He appeared in two games with the team that season. He was drafted by the Denver Broncos in the third round of the 1973 NFL draft but did not play for the team.

He attended Louisiana State University, where he was selected to the Associated Press and United Press first-team All-Southeastern Conference teams in 1972 while playing for the LSU Tigers. He was born in Lake Charles, Louisiana and attended Lake Charles High School.

References

1951 births
Living people
Players of American football from Louisiana
LSU Tigers football players
American football defensive tackles
New Orleans Saints players
Sportspeople from Lake Charles, Louisiana